Larry Robinson (April 18, 1942 – July 18, 2018) was a Canadian professional football player who played as a defensive back and placekicker for fifteen seasons in the Canadian Football League for the Calgary Stampeders from 1961 to 1975.

Calgary
As a member of the Calgary Stampeders, Larry Robinson played in three Grey Cup games: the 56th Grey Cup of 1968, lost to the Ottawa Rough Riders; the 58th Grey Cup of 1970, lost to the Montreal Alouettes; and the 59th Grey Cup of 1971, won against the Toronto Argonauts. Robinson was one of the best safety backs of his era. During the 1970 CFL season, Calgary met the Saskatchewan Roughriders in the Western conference finals. In the last game of the best-of-three series, with Saskatchewan leading 14–12, Robinson kicked a dramatic field goal with a few seconds remaining.

Robinson was a CFL West All-Star in 1965, 1971, and 1972. Throughout his career, he never missed a game.

Robinson died from cancer on July 18, 2018 at the age of 76.

Awards and honors
In 1961, Larry Robinson won the Dr. Beattie Martin Trophy as the top rookie in the Western Conference. Robinson was also runner up for the CFL's Most Outstanding Canadian Award in 1964 and 1965. For his strong defensive play and accurate place kicking, he was inducted into the Canadian Football Hall of Fame in 1998.

References

External links
 Larry Robinson at the Canadian Football Hall of Fame 

1942 births
2018 deaths
Canadian Football Hall of Fame inductees
Canadian football defensive backs
Canadian football return specialists
Canadian football placekickers
Calgary Stampeders players
Canadian football people from Calgary
Players of Canadian football from Alberta
Canadian Football League Rookie of the Year Award winners
People educated at Western Canada High School